Simone Moschin (born 20 January 1995) is an Italian professional footballer who plays as a goalkeeper for Maltese Premier League club Pietà Hotspurs.

Club career
Moschin started his career at Chievo; on 11 July 2014 Moschin left for Pisa on loan. Moschin made his Lega Pro (Serie C) debut for Pisa on 7 September 2014 in a game against Santarcangelo. At the end of season he returned to Cheivo, only loaned out again at the start of 2015–16 season.

In July 2016, Chievo sold Moschin to Serie B club Pro Vercelli for €4 million; at the same time the Verona-based team signed Mattia Bani from Vercelli also for €4 million.

Pro Vercelli immediately loaned Moschin to Lega Pro club Siena; in the next season Moschin was a player of another Serie C club Carrarese. On 14 January 2018 he left for Cuneo.

On 23 July 2021, he left Pro Vercelli and joined Fermana.

After spending six months without a club, on 31 January 2023 Moschin officially  joined Maltese side Pietà Hotspurs on a free transfer.

References

External links
 
 

1995 births
Living people
People from Vittorio Veneto
Footballers from Veneto
Italian footballers
Association football goalkeepers
Serie C players
A.C. ChievoVerona players
Pisa S.C. players
A.C. Renate players
F.C. Pro Vercelli 1892 players
A.C.N. Siena 1904 players
Carrarese Calcio players
A.C. Cuneo 1905 players
Fermana F.C. players
Sportspeople from the Province of Treviso